Irmo High School is a public high school in Columbia, South Carolina, United States. Irmo High School falls under the administrative jurisdiction of District 5 of Lexington and Richland Counties. It is an International Baccalaureate school.

Athletics
Irmo's sports teams compete as the Yellow Jackets and participate in Class 4A SCHSL. The school has won 66 team state championships.

Although Irmo had been the "Yellow Jackets" for many years, in 1978 a new logo was introduced. Prior to 1978, Irmo used a yellow jacket image for a logo similar to most schools that are known as yellow jackets.

Details by sport:

Football: The Irmo Yellow Jacket football team won a state championship in 1980.
Boys soccer: The Yellow Jackets have won 15 state championships and appeared in 25 state championship games since 1978.
State championships: 1978, 1979, 1982, 1987, 1988, 1989, 1990, 1993, 1995, 1996, 1997, 1998, 2000, 2003, 2004, 2013
Boys basketball: The Irmo boys' basketball team won state championship in 1991, 1994, 1995, 2011, 2013, and most recently 2023.
Boys tennis
Champions (10): 1983, 1987, 1988, 1989, 1991, 1993, 1994, 1995, 1997, 2001
Girls tennis:
Champions (8): 1990, 1991, 1992, 1996, 1998, 2000, 2001, 2004 
Baseball:
Champions (3): 1985, 1987, 1998 
Girls basketball
Boys cross country
Champions (5): 1977, 1978, 1979, 1992, 1998 
Girls cross country
Champions (6): 1977, 1978, 1979, 1980, 1981, 1982 
Boys golf
Champions (5): 1971, 1972, 1973, 1974, 1987
Girls golf
Champions (1): 1999
Girls soccer
Girls swimming
Champions (3): 1998, 1999, 2000
Boys track and field
Girls track and field
Champions (2): 1997, 1999 
Volleyball
Champions (2): 1998, 1999 
Wrestling
Champions (1): 1980

Marching band
The Irmo High School marching band won 5A SCBDA Marching Championships in 1991 and 1994–2003.

Feeder patterns
The  following middle schools feed into Irmo High School:
 Crossroads Intermediate School
 Irmo Middle School

Notable alumni
 Richard Evonitz, American serial killer, known for murdering three teenage girls in Spotsylvania County, Virginia
 Leeza Gibbons, American talk show host
 BJ McKie, professional basketball player
 Zach Prince, professional soccer player
 Courtney Shealy, Olympic gold medalist in women's swimming at 2000 Summer Olympics
 Bobby Weed, golf course designer
 David A. Wright, businessman, politician, and energy policy advisor

References

External links
 

Public high schools in South Carolina
International Baccalaureate schools in South Carolina
Schools in Lexington County, South Carolina